Candy Kitchen is an unincorporated community in Cibola County, New Mexico, United States, in the northwestern part of the state.  It is located at  (34.9142058, -108.4859053), at an altitude of 7,388 feet (2,252 m).

Attractions
Candy Kitchen is currently the home of the Wild Spirit Wolf Sanctuary which provides shelter for wolves and wolf-dog crosses who have been raised by people who could no longer provide care for them.

References

External links
 Wild Spirit Wolf Sanctuary
 Living Along The Ancient Way - Candy Kitchen & El Morro Valley, NM

Unincorporated communities in Cibola County, New Mexico
Unincorporated communities in New Mexico